Kurnakov (masculine) or Kurnakova (feminine) is a Russian surname. Notable people with the surname include:

 Nikolai Semenovich Kurnakov (1860–1941), Russian chemist
 Sergey Nikolaevich Kurnakov

Russian-language surnames